Tangla polyzonalis is a moth in the family Crambidae. It was described by George Hampson in 1898. It is found on Ambon Island in Indonesia and Fergusson Island in Papua New Guinea.

References

Moths described in 1898
Pyraustinae